Katarina Olofsson (born 1943) is a Swedish politician and member of the Riksdag for the Sweden Democrats party. She represents the constituency of Stockholm County. She is also the chairwoman of the SD's branch in Upplands-Bro Municipality. Olofsson is a retired civil engineer and described the so-called December Agreement following the 2014 Swedish government crisis as the factor that prompted her to join the Sweden Democrats and become politically active.

References 

1943 births
Living people
Members of the Riksdag from the Sweden Democrats